Jorge Rosa (born September 3, 1997) is a Puerto Rican footballer who plays as a midfielder for Puerto Rican club Bayamón FC.

Career
Rosa played most of his young career in Puerto Rico before moving to the United States where he played at Schulz Academy. He joined Bayamón FC in 2016.

International career
He was called up for the Puerto Rico national under-17 football team in 2012 where he got 3 caps in the first round of the FIFA World Cup qualification. In 2016 he made his debut with the Puerto Rico national football team in a friendly match against Indonesia.

References

Living people
1997 births
Puerto Rican footballers
Sportspeople from San Juan, Puerto Rico
Association football midfielders
University of Puerto Rico alumni
Bayamón FC players
Puerto Rico international footballers